The 2004 Men's World Ice Hockey Championships was the ninth such event hosted by the International Ice Hockey Federation. It took place between July 10 and July 17, 2004.

Tournament Format
The preliminary round will be played in four groups (A-D) with 4 teams each. The groups A and B form the Top Division, the groups C and D form Division I. The two last-placed teams of the groups A and B and the two first-placed teams of the groups C and D play for fourth place in group A and B to participate in the Top Division playoffs. The losers of those games play as first placed teams in group C and D to participate in the Division I playoffs. Playoffs starting with the quarterfinals and placement games will be played both in the Top Division and in Division I.

All games in the preliminary round and in the playoffs will be played with 5-minute sudden-death overtime and a penalty shootout in case of a tie. The final games will be played with a 12- minute sudden-death overtime, followed by a penalty shootout competition in case of a tie.

Teams will be awarded points on the following system:
 Win after regular time = 3 points
 Win after overtime or shootout = 2 points
 Loss after overtime or shootout = 1 point
 Loss after regular time = 0 points

Participating teams 

Groups are based on the results of the previous World Championships and Qualifying Series

Group A - Top Division

Group B - Top Division

Group C - Division I

Group D - Division I

Top Division

Preliminary round

Group A 

Group loser sent to compete in qualification round

Group B 

Group loser sent to compete in qualification round

Qualifying round

Play-off round

Draw

Quarter-finals

Semi-finals

5th-place game

7th-place game

Bronze-medal game

Gold-medal game

Ranking and statistics

Final standings
The final standings of the tournament according to IIHF:

Tournament awards
Best players selected by the directorate:
Best Goalkeeper:   Ari Luostarinen 
Best Defenseman: Ernie Hartlieb     
Best Forward:  Dejan Matejic

Division I

Qualification

European Zone
Played in Loverval, Belgium

Southern Hemisphere Zone
Played in South Africa

Asian Zone
Played in Taiwan

European-Asian Final
Played in Bad Tölz, Germany

Preliminary round

Group C 

Group Winner sent to compete in qualification round

Group B 

Group winner sent to compete in qualification round

Play-off round

Draw 
{{8TeamBracket-with third|team-width = 150
| medals     = y
| Consol     = Bronze-medal game
| RD1-seed1  = C3
| RD1-team1  = 
| RD1-score1 = 10
| RD1-seed2  = D2
| RD1-team2  = 
| RD1-score2 = 2
| RD1-seed3  = D4
| RD1-team3  = 
| RD1-score3 = 3
| RD1-seed4  = C1
| RD1-team4  = 
| RD1-score4 = 8
| RD1-seed5  = D3
| RD1-team5  = 
| RD1-score5 = 0
| RD1-seed6  = C2
| RD1-team6  = 
| RD1-score6 = 10''
| RD1-seed7  = C4
| RD1-team7  = 
| RD1-score7 = 3
| RD1-seed8  = D1
| RD1-team8  = | RD1-score8 = 8| RD2-seed1  = QF1
| RD2-team1  = 
| RD2-score1 = 5
| RD2-seed2  = QF2
| RD2-team2  = | RD2-score2 = 8| RD2-team3  = 
| RD2-seed3  = QF3
| RD2-score3 = 4
| RD2-seed4  = QF4
| RD2-team4  = | RD2-score4 = 5| RD3-seed3  = SF1
| RD3-team3  = | RD3-score3 = 7
| RD3-seed4  = SF2
| RD3-team4  = 
| RD3-score4 = 5
| RD3-seed1  = SF2
| RD3-team1  = | RD3-score1 = 5| RD3-seed2  = SF1
| RD3-team2  = 
| RD3-score2 = 4
}}

 Quarter-finals 

 Semi-finals 

5th-place game

7th-place game

 Bronze-medal game 

 Gold-medal game 

Ranking and statistics

Final standings
The final standings of the tournament according to IIHF:

Tournament awardsBest players selected by the directorate:Best Goalkeeper:   Rodrigo Santos Best Defenseman: Mark Thomas     Best Forward:'''  John Dolan

External links
Official Site 2004 IIHF World Inline Championships

References 

IIHF InLine Hockey World Championship
Iihf Mens Inline Hockey World Championship, 2004
2004 in German sport
Inline hockey in Germany
International sports competitions hosted by Germany